The NR4A1 gene is a transcription factor important in the development of cells that secrete the hormone insulin-like 3 (INSL3). In general, the NR4A gene family regulates cell growth and differentiation.

In humans, INSL3 aids in the regulation of testicular descent during fetal development. In an adult INSL3 helps in keeping germ cells alive, in both males and females.

In the male reproductive system the NR4A1 gene is a promoter of insulin-like 3 in Leydig cells. Leydig cells are located in the testis and known for the function as a support cell in spermatogenesis. Along with other things they secrete testosterone.

In females, INSL3 is also involved in the reproductive system. It is secreted by thecal and luteal cells in the ovary and thus is important in the maturation of developing oocytes.  In the rabbit model, disorders observed involving NR4A1 expression include testicular dysgenesis, and cryptorchidism.

Immunoprecipitation assays show that INSL3 does bind to NR4A1; however, much is still not known about INSL3 regulation and the direct involvement of the NR4A1 gene.

References 

Minireview:
Luc J. Martin and Jacques J. Tremblay
Nuclear Receptors in Leydig Cell Gene Expression and Function
Biol Reprod July 2010 83 (1) 3-14; published ahead of print April 7, 2010, doi:10.1095/biolreprod.110.083824

Testis:
Nicholas M. Robert, Luc J. Martin, and Jacques J. Tremblay
The Orphan Nuclear Receptor NR4A1 Regulates Insulin-Like 3 Gene Transcription in Leydig Cells
Biol Reprod February 2006 74 (2) 322-330; published ahead of print October 19, 2005, doi:10.1095/biolreprod.105.044560

Genes
Human proteins
Transcription factors